Liber Annuus is a yearly academic journal of theology and Biblical archaeology published by Studium Biblicum Franciscanum in Jerusalem.  The first issue appeared in 1951. One of its founders was the Italian archaeologist, Franciscan Bellarmino Bagatti.

References

Biblical studies journals
Publications established in 1951
Multilingual journals